The 2019 FINA Women's Water Polo World League was the 16th edition of the annual women's international water polo tournament. It was played between November 2018 and June 2019 and open to all women's water polo national teams. After participating in a preliminary round, eight teams qualified to play in a final tournament, called the Super Final from 4–9 June 2019.

In the world league, there are specific rules that do not allow matches to end in a draw. If teams are level at the end of the 4th quarter of any world league match, the match will be decided by a penalty shootout. Teams earn points in the standings in group matches as follows:
 Match won in normal time - 3 points
 Match won in shootout - 2 points
 Match lost in shootout - 1 point
 Match lost in normal time - 0 points

Preliminary rounds

European Preliminaries
 November, 2018 – May, 2019

Group A

Group B

Europa Cup Final
 March 29–31, 2019, Turin, Italy
Source: FINA

Quarterfinals
All times are CET (UTC+1).

Semifinals
All times are CET (UTC+1).

5th place match
All times are CET (UTC+1).

Bronze medal match
All times are CEST (UTC+2).

Gold medal match
All times are CEST (UTC+2).

Final ranking

Intercontinental Cup
 March 23–31, 2019, Perth, Australia

Group A

Group B

5th–8th place bracket

Championship bracket

Bronze medal match

All times are AWST (UTC+8).

Gold medal match

All times are AWST (UTC+8).

Final ranking

Super Final
 June 4–9, 2019, Budapest, Hungary

Venue

Qualified teams

Seeding

Preliminary round

Group A 
All times are CEST (UTC+2).

Group B
All times are CEST (UTC+2).

Final round
5th–8th place bracket

5th–8th place classification

All times are CEST (UTC+2).

7th place match

All times are CEST (UTC+2).

5th place match

All times are CEST (UTC+2).

Championship bracket

Quarterfinals

All times are CEST (UTC+2).

Semifinals

All times are CEST (UTC+2).

Bronze medal match

All times are CEST (UTC+2).

Gold medal match

All times are CEST (UTC+2).

Final ranking

Team Roster
Amanda Longan, Maddie Musselman, Melissa Seidemann, Rachel Fattal, Paige Hauschild, Maggie Steffens (C), Jamie Neushul, Kiley Neushul, Aria Fischer, Kaleigh Gilchrist , Makenzie Fischer, Alys Williams, Ashleigh Johnson, Jordan Raney, Stephania Haralabidis. Head coach: Adam Krikorian.

Individual awards

Most Valuable Player
 Maddie Musselman
Best Goalkeeper
 Laura Aarts
Top Scorer
 Maud Megens  Rita Keszthelyi — 17 goals

References

External links
 Media book 2019 

World League, women
2019
International water polo competitions hosted by Hungary
International sports competitions in Budapest
2019 in Hungarian sport